Dobrnež (in older sources Doberneš) is a settlement in the Municipality of Slovenske Konjice in eastern Slovenia. It lies on regional road leading east from Slovenske Konjice to Slovenska Bistrica. The area is part of the traditional region of Styria. The municipality is now included in the Savinja Statistical Region.

The Golič Mansion is a 16th-century mansion in the settlement. It is a three-storey building with a square floor plan and two rounded turrets on opposite corners. It was greatly modified in the 19th century.

References

External links
Dobrnež at Geopedia

Populated places in the Municipality of Slovenske Konjice